The Lune Millennium Bridge is a cable-stayed footbridge which spans the River Lune in Lancaster, England.

It was designed by Whitby Bird and Partners, and built at a cost of £1.8m to commemorate the millennium of 2000. The bridge forms a "Y"-shape in plan to connect one bank both to a viaduct and adjacent quay. Its double pylon seeks to act as a reminder of the masted ships which previously used the quay. It features a main gangway of just over 30 metres and masts around 40 metres tall.

The bridge is part of the National Cycle Network and connects multiple local cyclepaths together, including the one to Morecambe, the one to Caton and the one to Glasson Dock. It's part of route 6 and its design received the Sustrans National Cycle Network Award for Excellence in 2005, and was commended in the Civic Trust Awards in 2003.

Its location is culturally significant as the near-approximate site of the historic Old Loyne Bridge.

External links
http://www.lunemillenniumbridge.info/
An animation of the bridge's mode of vibration.
Construction photographs
Designer's website

Bridges across the River Lune
Bridges completed in 2000
Cable-stayed bridges in England
Buildings and structures celebrating the third millennium
Bridges in Lancaster, Lancashire
Pedestrian bridges in England
Recipients of Civic Trust Awards
Transport in the City of Lancaster
2000 establishments in England